The 1925–26 season was the 49th Scottish football season in which Dumbarton competed at national level, entering the Scottish Football League and the Scottish Cup.  In addition Dumbarton played in the Dumbartonshire Cup and the Dumbartonshire Charity Cup.

Scottish League 

The fourth season in a row in the Second Division did not start well, and with only 3 wins recorded by the beginning of December any hopes of promotion had long gone.  In the end however Dumbarton finished 11th out of 20 with 38 points - 21 behind champions Dunfermline Athletic.

Scottish Cup 

In the Scottish Cup, Dumbarton reached the fourth round before losing out to Celtic.

Dumbartonshire Cup 
Dumbarton were runners-up in the Dumbartonshire Cup, losing to Helesburgh in the final.

Dumbartonshire Charity Cup 
Dumbarton were also runners-up in the Charity Cup, losing to Clydebank in the final.

Friendly 
A benefit match was played at the beginning of the season against Clydebank.

Player statistics

Squad

|}

Source:

Transfers

Players in

Players out 

In addition William Middleton played his last game in Dumbarton 'colours'.

Source:

References

Dumbarton F.C. seasons
Scottish football clubs 1925–26 season